A learning curve is a relationship of the duration or the degree of effort invested in learning and experience with the resulting progress, considered as an exploratory discovery process. 

Learning Curve may also refer to:

 Experience curve effects, regularly observed reduction in costs of manufacturing and delivery with increased experience.  Associated mathematical models
 "Learning Curve" (Babylon 5), an episode of the science fiction television series Babylon 5
 "Learning Curve" (Stargate SG-1), an episode of the science fiction television series Stargate SG-1
 "Learning Curve" (Voyager episode), an episode of the science fiction television series Star Trek: Voyager
 The Learning Curve, a 2001 thriller film
 Learning Curve (1998 film), a 1998 film about a substitute teacher in a public school, also goes by the name 'Detention 1998'
 Learning Curve, an album by British DJ DJ Rap
Learning Curve Brands, a designer and manufacturer of products for infants and children of all ages, a subsidiary of RC2 Corporation, acquired by Takara Tomy in 2011
 Learning curve (machine learning), a tool to find out how much a machine learning model benefits from adding more training data or epochs